Twin Lakes is an unincorporated community and census-designated place (CDP) in Twin Lakes and Sherman townships in Calhoun County, Iowa, United States. As of the 2010 census it had a population of 334.

Geography
The CDP consists of lakefront communities surrounding two lakes, North Twin Lake and South Twin Lake. The lakes, which do not have a discernible surface outlet, are part of the North Raccoon River watershed, a tributary of the Des Moines River. Twin Lakes State Park occupies the surface area of the two lakes plus small portions of the shoreline.

U.S. Route 20 runs just south of the southern edge of the CDP, leading east  to Fort Dodge and west  to Sioux City.

Demographics

References

External links

Census-designated places in Calhoun County, Iowa
Census-designated places in Iowa